Grandes is a group of three small islands off the east coast of Crete. Administratively it comes within the Itanos municipality in Lasithi. Grandes can be seen from the Minoan site of Roussolakkos near Palekastro as can the island of Elasa.

Landforms of Lasithi
Uninhabited islands of Crete
Islands of Greece